The MRT Orange Line is a rapid transit line of the Mass Rapid Transit Authority of Thailand (MRTA) in the Bangkok Metropolitan Area, Thailand.

The line is divided into two sections; the  Eastern section from Suwinthawong to Thailand Cultural Centre and the 2nd phase,  Western section from Thailand Cultural Centre to Bang Khun Non. Construction of the  Eastern Section started in June 2017. The line is scheduled to open in 2023.

By the end of November 2022, construction had progressed to 98.31%.

Western extension tender delayed

On 3 July 2020, the MRTA released the tender for the design and construction of the Western extension. However in late August 2020, the tender submission deadline was subsequently delayed. and the MRTA amended the tender assessment criteria resulting in a lawsuit and an injunction suspending the tender decision. The tender was subsequently cancelled by the MRTA in February 2021 given ongoing litigation by the BTSC. After approval by the Administrative Court given ongoing litigation, a new tender issued in October has a deadline for bids of January 2022.

The Criminal Court - Corruption and Malfeasance Division hearing into the cancelled tender process was conducted in late December 2021 which further delayed the reissued tender timeframe. Subject to court approval, the MRTA planned to review tender bids for a period of 3 months before seeking Cabinet approval for a reissued tender in April or May 2022. The MRTA reissued the new tender on 24 May 2022 with tender packages available for purchase until 10 June. 14 different companies purchased the auction envelopes.

The 141 billion baht western extension consists of 86 billion baht for civil works, 14 billion for land appropriation and 31 billion for systems installation, rolling stock and maintenance.  The winning bidder is expected to be announced in August 2022.

Route Alignment
The MRT Orange Line starts at Suwinthawong rd in Min Buri District in Bangkok's eastern suburbs as an elevated line running along Ramkhamhaeng Road. It will interchange with the future MRT Yellow Line at Lam Sali station. It then proceeds underground near Lam Sali intersection in Bang Kapi District, where there will be a transfer to the MRT Yellow Line. It continues southwest along Ramkhamhaeng Road, passing Hua Mak Stadium and Ramkhamhaeng University to Rama IX rd intersection. The line then proceeds west along Rama IX rd and crosses Pradit Manutham Road to the current Mass Rapid Transit Authority of Thailand (MRTA) Headquarters and MRT Blue line depot. Then it routes north to the Thailand Cultural Centre Station to interchange with the MRT Blue Line.

The western section of the MRT Orange Line, runs west from Thailand Cultural Centre Station via Din Daeng housing estates and Bangkok City Hall 2 to Vibhavadi Rangsit Road, Sam Liam Din Daeng Junction. Then turns left into Ratchaprarop Road towards Pratu Nam and turns right into Phetchaburi Road then interchanges with BTS Sukhumvit Line at Ratchathewi Station. It continues along Lan Luang Road and Ratchadamnoen Avenue, then crosses the Chao Phraya River near Phra Pinklao Bridge, passes Siriraj Hospital and goes along Bangkok Noi Rail line and terminates at Bang Khun Non at Charan Sanitwong rd, where it interchanges with the MRT Blue Line.

History
The original plan of the MRT Orange Line aimed to serve travel demand between the northwestern area of Thonburi, at Bang Bamru Railway Station in Bang Phlat District, and the east of Bangkok in Bang Kapi District. It was planned to run along Ramkhamhaeng Road and Ratchawithi Road, passing many public places like Hua Mak Stadium, Dusit Zoo and Victory Monument, and provide access to universities including Ramkhamhaeng University, Suan Sunandha and Suan Dusit Rajabhat University and many government offices.

In 2009, the proposed MRT Brown line from Bang Kapi District, elevated along Ram Khamhaeng Road, to the eastern suburb in Saphan Sung District and Min Buri District, was merged with the Orange Line in Bangkok's mass rapid transit master plan. In July 2011, the section from Bang Khun Non to Taling Chan was finally scrapped in favour of the SRT Light Red Line spur line which duplicates the same route. In 2012, there were further notable changes made to the central and western sections of the Orange Line. The section from Din Daeng District to Bang Bamru was rerouted away from Victory Monument and Ratchawithi road route to further run south to Pratunam and then west along Petchaburi Road and Larn Luang Road. Continuing farther west along Ratchadamnoen Klang Road and Sanam Luang before passing under the Chao Praya river and finally terminating at Bang Khun Non to interchange with the MRT Blue Line extension.

The MRT Orange line Eastern section was originally planned to be tendered by the end of 2013. However, due to protests by residents regarding station footprint and compulsory land acquisition around stations at Pratunam, Ratchaprarop, Pracha Songkhro and Soesim stations the MRTA needed another 12 months to redesign sections of the line. Subsequently, political protests against the Thai government led to the metro transport funding bill lapsing when parliament was dissolved in December 2013. On 9 December 2015, Cabinet finally approved the Orange Line.

Construction Progress
Construction contracts were signed on 9 February 2017 between the MRTA and CKST Joint Venture consortium. Construction finally started in June 2017 with a 1980 day construction period with a scheduled opening in October 2022. Project construction is divided into 4 contracts. The eastern section new planned opening date is 2023.

As of 31 December 2017, the progress of civil works construction was at 4.66% according to the MRTA. As of July 2018, overall construction progress was 13.57%. As of August 2018, overall construction progress was 16.21%. By 30 September 2018, overall construction had progressed to 18.33%. At the end of March 2019, construction had progressed to 32.12%. At the end of July 2019, civil construction was at 42.27%. At the end of October 2019, construction had progressed to 49.05%. At the end of January 2020, construction had progressed to 54.93%. By the end of May 2020, construction had progressed to 62.42%. At the end of July 2020, construction had progressed to 66.06%. On 5 October 2020, TBM number 2 finished tunneling and reached Ramkhamhaeng 12 station box as part of contract 2. At the end of September 2020, was at 69.82%. At the end of January 2020, construction had progressed to 76.09%. Construction progress was 79.44% complete by the end of March 2021. Construction progress was 81.03% by the end of April 2021. Construction progress was 87.24% by the end of October 2021. Construction progress was 88.46% by the end of November 2021. By the end of March 2022, construction progress was at 92.69%.

By the end of May 2022, construction had progressed to 94.51%.

Construction contracts
Construction is divided into four separate contracts.

Contract 1 is for 6.29 km underground and 4 underground stations from Thai Cultural Centre interchange station to Rankhamhaeng 12 station.

Contract 2 is for 3.44 km underground and 4 underground stations from Ramkhamheang 12 station to Hua Mark station.

Contract 3 is for 4.04 km underground and 3 underground stations from Hua Mark station to Klong Ban Ma station.

Contract 4 is 8.8 km and 7 elevated stations from Klong Ban Ma to Suwinthawong terminus station.

Rolling stock
The tender for operation of the line and purchase of rolling stock for both the eastern and western sections was issued in May 2022, along with the construction of the western section.

Phase 2 Western Extension
The Phase 2 Western extension of the Orange line will run from Thailand Cultural Centre to Bang Khun Non via Pratunam. The  western section will run underground with 12 stations.

The Thai Cabinet was expected to approve the 121 billion baht budget for the Western extension in mid 2017 with a tender due for the 2nd half of 2017. However, this decision was delayed until 2018 as Cabinet requested options to be considered for a joint public and private investment proposal. There were further delays into 2019, but the MRTA finalised a joint PPP plan for Cabinet to approve in mid 2019. On 28 January 2020, the Cabinet approved the 142 billion baht extension. It is expected to open in February 2026 and serve 439,000 passengers daily.

On 3 July 2020, the MRTA released the tender for the design, construction and operation of the Western extension as a Public-Private Partnership project on a 30 year lease. The tender deadline was 23 September 2020 with the successful bidder to be announced in early October 2020. The tender specified a construction period of 3 and a half years.

There were 10 tenderers that purchased the request for proposal (RFP) form with two major consortiums that submitted final bids:

 Bangkok Expressway and Metro Public Company Limited (BEM) - operator of the MRT Blue Line and MRT Purple Lines.
 BSR Consortium, led by Bangkok Mass Transit System Public Company Limited (BTSC), and supported by BTS Group Holdings (BTS Group) and Sino-Thai Engineering and Construction (STECON). BTSC is the future operator of the MRT Pink Line and MRT Yellow Lines which are both under construction.

However, in late August 2020 the tender submission deadline was subsequently delayed by the MRTA. Thereafter, the MRTA amended the tender assessment criteria resulting in a lawsuit being lodged by the BTSC in the Administrative Court on 17 September 2020 with the Court imposing an injunction suspending the tender decision. The tender was subsequently cancelled by the MRTA in February 2021 due to litigation by the BTSC. After approval by the Administrative Court given ongoing litigation, a new tender issued in October has a deadline for bids of January 2022.

The Criminal Court Corruption and Malfeasance division hearings into the cancelled tender process were conducted from 14 to 24 December 2021 and have delayed the reissued tender timeframe. Subject to court approval, the MRTA plans to review tender bids for a period of 3 months before seeking final Cabinet approval of the winning bid in April 2022.  However, there are construction budget concerns for the extension as steel prices have increased by 40% since the previous budget was approved. The EIA for the western extension was also updated in December 2021 as Din Daeng station was moved north by 500m, Pracha Songkhro station was moved east by 450m and Yommarat station was redesigned.

The MRTA reissued the new tender auction on 24 May with tender packages available for purchase until 10 June. The 141 billion baht western extension consists of 86 billion baht for civil works, 14 billion for land appropriation and 31 billion for systems installation, rolling stock and maintenance. The MRTA announced in September 2022 that the BEM-led consortium had submitted the most financially favorable bid of the two remaining bidders.

Stations

Network Map

See also

 Mass Rapid Transit Master Plan in Bangkok Metropolitan Region
 MRT (Bangkok)
 MRT Blue Line
 MRT Brown Line
 MRT Grey Line
 MRT Light Blue Line
 MRT Pink Line
 MRT Purple Line
 MRT Yellow Line
 BTS Skytrain
 Sukhumvit Line
 Silom Line
 Airport Rail Link (Bangkok)
 SRT Dark Red Line
 SRT Light Red Line
 Bangkok BRT
 BMA Gold Line
 BMA Bang Na-Airport Line

References

External links 

 "MRT Orange Line Eastern Section"
 Airport Rail Link, BTS, MRT & BRT network map
 MRTA

Proposed public transport in Thailand
Orange line
2024 in rail transport